Parkia javanica Lam., syn. Parkia roxburghii G. Don. (Indonesian: kedaung, Javanese: kedhawung, Filipino: cupang)  is a plant of the genus Parkia in the family Mimosaceae.
Description-

Plant- A middle-sized unarmed tree (up to 30 m) with spreading branches, twig brown, pubescent.

Leaves- Alternate, compound, bipinnate, petiolate, petiole long with gland below and lower pair of pinnae and a few between the upper pinna; pinna 8-30 pairs, opposite; leaflets 40–80 pairs close set, sessile, linear-oblong, fulcate (sickle or scythe shaped), truncate at the base (as it cut off by a straight transverse line; blunt) ; stipulate, leaf base frequently swollen forming pulvinus.

Inflorescence- Racemose in dense clavate, long peduncled heads with sterile flowers lower down, peduncle 30–40 cm long; receptacle of the inflorescence narrowed into 2.5–3 cm long stalk.

Flower- Small, bractate, bracts spathulate, silky pubescent outside; complete, bisexual, regular, actinomorphic, hypogynus, pentamerous, thallamus slightly cup shaped, pale yellow.

Calyx- Sepals 5, gamosepalous, tubular,tube short and cylindrical, glabrous, 5 cleft, lobes pilose, imbricate (though the sepals of Mimosaceae are valvate, the only exception is Parkia in which sepals are imbricate.)

Corolla- Petals 5, polypetalous, connate below into a short tube, cleft halfway down, pale yellow, valvate.

Androecium- Stamen 10, monadelphous, filaments filiform and united in the lower part with each other, exserted; anthers narrow, without apical glands, versatile.

Gynoecium- Pistil monocarpellary, ovary free from the hypantheum, superior, 1 chambered, many ovules along with the ventral sutter, placentation marginal; style one, filiform ; stigma one, minute, capitate.

Fruit- Linear subsucculant pod, fiat, strap-shaped, 25–50* 3.5–4 cm; glabrous; top rounded, base narrowed into a long pedicel.

Flowering time- October–December.

Fruiting time- December–April.

Distribution- India to Taimur.

Occurrence- Throughout Tripura ; scarce

Identification-

Genus- Parkia

I) Stamens 10.

II) Flowers in heads.

III) Flowers without apical glands.

IV) Unarmed mid-sized trees.

V) Monadelphous; Flowers pale yellow.

Vernacular names
Manipuri- zongchak/yongchak ; Bishnupriya Manipuri- longchak ; Bengali- longchak ; Kokborok (Tripuri)-wakreh  ; Mizo-zwangtah ; Indonesian-kedaung ; Javanese-kedhawung ; Filipino-cupang ; Chinese- qui hua dou (Taiwan) ; Burmese- mai-karien ; Malaysia- kedung ; Thai- reang/karieng.

Ethnobotanical importance
This plant is known as an important medicinal plant in the herb industry in Indonesia, using mainly the seed. In addition, other parts which considered medicinal are the bark, leaves and the root. It is most sought after for its anti-bacterial properties and is applied in traditional medicine for infections and stomach disorders.

Some states in the North-East India like Mizoram (where it's called 'Zawngtah'), Manipur (where it's called 'Yongchak'), etc. use its fruit (the bean-liked part) as part of their meal. This bean after having its skin scraped off is eaten raw or cooked by the Mizo and other hill people of north-east India.

References

javanica
Edible legumes